David Wallis Walters (2 January 1878 – 10 February 1952) was a British and Welsh hurdler and long jumper. He competed in the men's 110 metres hurdles at the 1908 Summer Olympics. He was the 1904 British long jump champion.

References

1878 births
1952 deaths
Athletes (track and field) at the 1906 Intercalated Games
Athletes (track and field) at the 1908 Summer Olympics
British male hurdlers
Olympic athletes of Great Britain
Place of birth missing